The 1914–15 season was the 41st season of competitive football played by Rangers.

Overview
Rangers played a total of 44 competitive matches during the 1914–15 season. They finished third in the Scottish League Division One after winning 23 of the 38 league matches and collecting a total of 50 points (15 behind league winners Celtic).

The Scottish Cup was not competed for this season as the Scottish Football Association had withdrawn the tournament due to the outbreak of the First World War.

Results
All results are written with Rangers' score first.

Scottish League Division One

Appearances

See also
 1914–15 in Scottish football
 Navy and Army War Fund Shield

References

Rangers F.C. seasons
Rangers